This is a list of episodes from the anime Burst Angel.

Burst Angel